Route 147 is a state highway in central Connecticut running from Durham to Middlefield.

Route description

Route 147 begins as Middlefield Road at an intersection with Route 17 just north of the town center of Durham. It heads northwest, crossing into the town of Middlefield after , where the road changes name to Durham Road. Route 147 continues northwest and north for another  until it ends at an intersection with Route 66 in northwestern Middlefield.

History
In the 1920s, the Durham-Middlefield route continuing towards Meriden was designated as a secondary state highway known as Highway 330. It ran more or less along the alignment of modern Route 147. In the 1932 state highway renumbering, old Highway 330 was renumbered to Route 147. At the same time, the Middlefield-Middletown route was created as Route 157. By 1938, Route 157 took over the Durham Road portion of Route 147. In 1966, however, this change was reversed and Route 157 was extended to the southwest towards along its modern alignment south of Route 147.

Junction list

References

External links

147
Transportation in Middlesex County, Connecticut